The 2001 UCI Mountain Bike World Cup included four disciplines: cross-country, cross-country time-trial, downhill, and dual-slalom. It was sponsored by Tissot.

The cross-country, downhill and dual-slalom events on 7 and 8 July were originally scheduled to be held at Whistler, but were moved to Grouse Mountain.

Cross country

Cross-country time-trial

Downhill

Dual-slalom

See also
2001 UCI Mountain Bike & Trials World Championships

UCI Mountain Bike World Cup
Mountain Bike World Cup
2001 in Canadian sports
International cycle races hosted by Canada